Johann Michael Feder (25 May 1753 at Oellingen in Bavaria – 26 July 1824 at Würzburg) was a German Roman Catholic theologian.

Life
He studied in the episcopal seminary of Würzburg from 1772–1777; in the latter year he was ordained priest and promoted to the licentiate in theology. For several years Feder was chaplain of the Julius hospital; in 1785 he was appointed extraordinary professor of theology and Oriental languages at the University of Würzburg. He was created a Doctor of Divinity in 1786; director of the university library 1791, ordinary professor of theology and censor of theological publications, 1795.

After the reorganization of the University of Würzburg, 1803-4, he was appointed chief librarian, resigning the professorship of theology in 1805. Shortly after his removal from office as librarian, November, 1811, he suffered a stroke of apoplexy, from which he never fully recovered.

References
Feder was a prolific writer, editor, and translator, imbued with the liberal views of his time. His revision of Dr. Heinrich Braun's German translation of the Bible (1803), 2 vols., served as the basis for Joseph Franz Allioli's translation.

He also translated widely:

the writings of Cyril of Jerusalem (1786); 
the sermons of Chrysostom on Matthew and John, in conjunction with Eulogius Schneider (1786–88);
Theodoret's ten discourses on Divine Providence (1788); 
Gerard's lectures on pastoral duties (1803); 
de Bausset's life of Fénelon (1800–12), 3 vols., and the same author's life of Bossuet (1820); 
Fabert's "Meditations" (1786).

He was editor of the Magazin zur Beförderung des Schulwesens (1791–97), 3 vols., of the Prakt.-theol. Magazin für katholische Geistliche (1798–1800), and of the Würzburger Gelehrten Anzeigen (1788–92). He also wrote several volumes of sermons.

References

Attribution

1753 births
1824 deaths
18th-century German Catholic theologians
German male non-fiction writers
18th-century German writers
19th-century German writers
19th-century German male writers
18th-century German male writers